Antonio Mesa was a Cuban baseball third baseman in the Cuban League. He played with the Habana club in the 1902–03 and 1904–05 seasons. He was elected to the Cuban Baseball Hall of Fame in 1948.

References

External links

Cuban League players
Cuban baseball players
Habana players